Christian Bookshop is an album by Irish musicians Jimmy Monaghan and Aisling Walsh released in 2012.

Recording
Christian Bookshop was recorded in the pantry of Monaghan's home in Belmullet Co Mayo, and features Monaghan on acoustic guitar and vocals, Aisling Walsh on vocals and percussion, with contributions from Evelyn Walsh on clarinet, Eleta Van Schalkwyk on violin and Trista Monaghan on tin whistle.

Track listing

References

External links
 Christian Bookshop on Bandcamp

2012 albums
Jimmy Monaghan albums